Murcot is a hamlet in the English county of Worcestershire.

Murcot is located in the west of the Vale of Evesham and is to the west and south of the village of Wickhamford. Administratively Murcot is part of the district of Wychavon.

External links 

Hamlets in Worcestershire